You Get There from Here is a compilation album by Australian rock musician Diesel. The album was released on 8 June 2012.
The album contains 14 tracks "hand-picked" by Diesel himself.

Track listing
 "15 Feet of Snow" – 5:!5
 "All Come Together" – 4:45
 "Never Miss Your Water" – 3:55
 "I've Been Loving You Too Long"  (Acoustic)  – 3:52
 "Masterplan" – 5:19
 "Days Like These" – 3:24
 "Ain't Giving Up" – 4:28
 "Saviour" – 4:28
 "Steal My Sunshine" – 3:53
 "Man Alive"  (Live)  – 6:14
 "Faith and Gasoline" – 3:40
 "Tip of My Tongue"  (Live)  – 7:08
 "Cry in Shame"  (Live)  – 3:41
 "Come to Me"  (Acoustic)  – 4:28

Release history

References

Diesel (musician) albums
2012 compilation albums
Liberation Records albums
Compilation albums by Australian artists